The Unpleasantness at the Bellona Club is a 1928 mystery novel by Dorothy L. Sayers, her fourth featuring Lord Peter Wimsey. Much of the novel is set in the Bellona Club, a fictional London club for war veterans (Bellona being a Roman goddess of war).

Plot
On the afternoon of 10 November, ninety-year-old General Fentiman is called to the deathbed of his estranged sister, Lady Dormer, and learns that under the terms of her will he stands to inherit most of her substantial fortune – money sorely needed by his grandsons Robert and George Fentiman. However, should the General die first, nearly everything will go to Lady Dormer's companion, Ann Dorland.

Lady Dormer dies the next morning, Armistice Day, and that afternoon the General is found dead in his armchair at the Bellona Club. Dr Penberthy, a club member and the General's personal physician, certifies death by natural causes but is unable to state the exact time of death. As the estate would amply provide for all three claimants, and as it is unknown whether the General or his sister died first, the Fentiman brothers suggest a negotiated settlement with Ann Dorland, but she surprisingly and vehemently refuses. Wimsey is asked to investigate.

Unusually, nobody saw the General arrive at the club at his usual time of 10 am. His manservant reports that the General did not return home after visiting his sister the day before. An unknown man by the name of Oliver telephoned to say that the General would be spending the night with him. Robert Fentiman says that he knows of Oliver, and much time is spent chasing the elusive individual through several countries before Robert admits that he does not actually exist.

Wimsey discovers that after seeing his sister the General had felt ill and had consulted Dr Penberthy. He then travelled to the club, meeting George Fentiman en route. There he informed Robert of the terms of the will and very shortly afterwards was found dead in the library, apparently of natural causes. Piqued at losing his inheritance, Robert concealed the body overnight, and invented Oliver to cover up the death. The next day, while the club members had stepped outside to observe the usual two minutes' silence at 11 am, Robert moved the body to an armchair to be found later.

Wimsey is still unsatisfied as to the cause of death, and has the body exhumed and re-examined. The General had been poisoned with an overdose of the heart medication digitalis. When it becomes known that the body will be exhumed, Ann Dorland, who has an obvious motive, suddenly and suspiciously agrees to the proposed compromise with the Fentimans.

Wimsey finds Ann Dorland distressed by the callous and humiliating behaviour of Dr Penberthy, to whom she had been secretly engaged. It was he, with an eye on her expected inheritance, who had insisted she should refuse the compromise and fight for the whole estate. However, as soon as it became known that the General had been poisoned he broke the engagement off, ensuring Ann's embarrassed silence by giving highly insulting reasons.

Wimsey works out what had happened. When the General had consulted Dr Penberthy after seeing his sister, he had mentioned the will, and Penberthy realised that if the General did not die at once his fiancée would not inherit. He gave the General a massive dose of digitalis, to be taken later that evening when Penberthy would not be in attendance. He was however present next day when the body was discovered and, in spite of Robert's intervention which confused the time, was able without raising suspicions to certify a natural death.

Penberthy writes a confession publicly exonerating Ann Dorland, then shoots himself in the club library. In an epilogue, it is revealed that the three original claimants to the estate have divided it equitably, and that Robert is now dating Ann.

Characters 
Lord Peter Wimsey – aristocratic amateur detective; Bellona Club member
Detective-Inspector Charles Parker – Wimsey's friend
Mervyn Bunter – Wimsey's manservant
Mr Murbles – solicitor to the Wimsey and Fentiman families
General Fentiman (deceased) – elderly retired soldier; Bellona Club member
Lady Dormer (deceased) – General Fentiman's wealthy widowed sister
Major Robert Fentiman – General Fentiman's older grandson; Bellona Club member
Captain George Fentiman – General Fentiman's younger grandson; Bellona Club member
Sheila Fentiman – wife of George Fentiman
Ann Dorland – distant relative of and companion to Lady Dormer
Dr Penberthy – impecunious physician; Bellona Club member
Marjorie Phelps – artist friend of Wimsey and of Ann Dorland
Salcombe Hardy – journalist writing for the Daily Yell
Captain Culyer – Bellona Club secretary
Colonel Marchbanks – Bellona Club member
Mr. Wetheridge – Bellona Club member
Dick Challoner – Bellona Club member

Literary significance and criticism
Writing in 1990, Katherine Kenny described the book as the most successful of Sayers' early fiction, coupling a slick detective plot with vivid details of post-war English life. "The book is a tightly constructed little drama based upon the old joke about an Englishman's club so stuffy that its dead members cannot be differentiated from the living – a pertinent comment upon the society so described".

Adaptations
In 1973 the novel was the subject of a BBC TV mini-series starring Ian Carmichael as Wimsey.

References

External links
 
Annotating Wimsey on "The Unpleasantness at the Bellona Club"

1928 British novels
Novels by Dorothy L. Sayers
Novels set in London
British mystery novels
Novels set in the 1920s
British novels adapted into television shows
Ernest Benn Limited books